Bhau Panchabhai (1 March 1944 - 21 January 2016) was an Indian Marathi language poet, writer, and Ambedkarite-Dalit activist. He is best known for his first poetry collection Hunkaar Vadaalnche (हुंकार वादळांचे) for which he was awarded by the Government of Maharashtra for the best poetry collection of 1989. His poetry is considered as a prototype of Ambedkarite poetry and is translated in various languages including English. He lived in Nagpur and worked as a lawyer.
He was awarded Laxmibai Ingole, Kavya Puruskar by the Laxmibai Ingole Foundation Amravati in 2015 for his contribution to Ambedkarite literature.

Ambedkarite Activist & writings 
He was active in the Ambedkarite movement and Panthers of India.

Writings - 
(A)poetry collection
 Hunkaar Vaadalaanche ( हुंकार वादळांचे) 1989
 Nikharyaanchyaa Raangolyaa (निखाऱ्यांच्या रांगोळ्या) 2004
 Abhanganchya Thingya (अभंगांच्या ठिणग्या) 2014
 Spandanpisara (स्पंदनपिसारा) 2014
 Aakantgandha (आकांतगंधा)

Being Released Shortly
(B) LALIT LEKH
 Jakhamancha Ajintha (जखमांचा अजिंठा) 1992
(C) VAICHARIK LEKH
 Samajkranti (समाजक्रांती) 1992

References

External links
Panchbhai obituary

1944 births
2016 deaths
Dalit activists
Indian male poets
Writers from Nagpur
Living people
Marathi-language poets
Marathi-language writers
Place of birth missing (living people)